The Midnight Mission is a human services organization in downtown Los Angeles' Skid Row. It was founded in 1914. A secular non-profit, the organization provides food, drug and alcohol recovery services, "safe sleep" programs, educational training, a mobile kitchen, and family housing with an emphasis on developing self-sufficiency.

Background 
The term "midnight mission" was common in the 19th and early 20th centuries to designate efforts by domestic missionaries in the United States against so-called "white slavery", a deprecated term for prostitution.

History

The Midnight Mission was founded by businessman and lay minister Tom Liddecoat in 1914.  Meals were served at midnight, after church services.  

As of 1920, the mission held nightly religious services. The mission became an incorporated non-profit in 1922.

During the Great Depression, the Midnight Mission was a major residence in Los Angeles for people who lacked permanent housing.

During World War II, the mission began assisting with job placement and established job training programs.

In 1963, the Midnight Mission conducted a survey of people living in Skid Row, and concluded that alcoholism was a significant contributor to their life situation. In 1974, they named recovered alcoholic and popular A.A. speaker Clancy Imislund as managing director, a role he undertook for many decades.

In 2004, a campaign called Building a Home for Hope raised funds for an expanded facility.  David Bentley was hired as the owner's project manager by the Board and oversaw the design by Gin Wong Associates and the construction by Snyder Langston until the new facility on San Pedro route Street opened in April 2005.  Permitting and construction was difficult due to the site being within an active archeological zone. San Pedro Street was the original access route from downtown Los Angeles to the port in San Pedro in the 1800s.  

In 2005, the shelter served three meals to approximately 170 residents and 500 guests each day.  The shelter continues to emphasize their role as a "bridge to self-sufficiency", making this the first bullet point in their mission statement.  The Mission is not associated with any religious group.

References

External links
Official website

Homelessness charities
Organizations based in Los Angeles
Organizations established in 1914
1914 establishments in California